Amics del Bàsquet Castelló, also known as TAU Castelló for sponsorship reasons, is a basketball team based in Castellón de la Plana, Spain. It was founded in 1994 and currently plays in LEB Oro.

Real Madrid's coach Pablo Laso started his coach career in this team, in the 2003–2004 LEB 2 season.

History
Founded in 1994, Amics Castelló played for the first time the Liga EBA in the 1999–2000 season, achieving in 2002 a vacant berth to play the LEB 2 league, Spanish third division. After four seasons always in the low part of the standings, Amics Castelló was relegated to the Liga EBA, where it played during the six next seasons, only qualifying for the promotion playoffs in the last one.

However, the club achieved again a vacant place in LEB Plata, playing there until the 2014–15 season, when the club won the Copa LEB Plata by defeating CEBA Guadalajara and promoted to LEB Oro, also defeating the team from Castile-La Mancha.

Players

Current roster

Depth chart

Season by season

Trophies and awards

Trophies
Copa LEB Plata: (1)
2015

Individual awards
LEB Plata MVP
Ola Atoyebi – 2014
Nick Washburn – 2015

Copa LEB Plata MVP
Nick Washburn – 2015

External links
Official website

Sport in Castellón de la Plana
Basketball teams in the Valencian Community
Former LEB Plata teams
Basketball teams established in 1994